Lumbala may refer to:

Lumbala (surname)
Lumbala-Kakengue
Lumbala N'guimbo